Margrethe Haarr (born 10 April 1985) is a Norwegian politician.

She was elected deputy representative to the Storting from the constituency of Hedmark for the periods 2017–2021 and 2021–2025, for the Centre  Party. She replaces Emilie Mehl at the Storting from 2021 while Mehl is government minister. She has been mayor in Kongsvinger.

References

1995 births
Living people
People from Kongsvinger
Centre  Party (Norway) politicians
Members of the Storting
Mayors of places in Hedmark